Sir Richard Lewknor (bapt. 14 March 1541 – 6 April 1616) of Downeley, West Dean, Sussex, was an English politician.

He was the son of Edmund Lewknor of Tangmere, Sussex and the brother of Thomas Lewknor, MP. He was educated at the Middle Temple and there called to the bar.

Career
He was made a bencher in 1581 and sergeant-at-law in 1594. He was appointed Recorder of Chichester from 1588 to 1590 and a judge on the Chester circuit in 1589, where he was promoted to be Chief Justice of Chester in 1603, a position he held until his death. As a judge he was impartial although a staunch Catholic, even sentencing four Catholic priests to death. He also held a number of public commissions during his career and was knighted in 1600.

He was elected Member (MP) of the Parliament of England for Chichester in 1572, 1584, 1586, 1589, 1593 and 1597. In Parliament he sat on a number of committees. 

He moved to Wales after his appointment as Chief Justice of Chester and effectively ran the country for some time between the death in 1601 of Henry Herbert, 2nd Earl of Pembroke, the Lord President of Wales and the arrival of the new Lord President, Lord Zouch, in 1602.

Private life
He married twice. From his first marriage he had two sons, after which he married Margaret, the daughter of Thomas Atkins of London and widow of both Thomas Hughes, the royal physician and Stephen Hadnall of Lancelevy, Hampshire.
 
In 1589, he bought the manor of West Dean.

References

1541 births
1616 deaths
People from West Dean, West Sussex
Members of the Middle Temple
16th-century English judges
Knights Bachelor
English MPs 1572–1583
English MPs 1584–1585
English MPs 1586–1587
English MPs 1589
English MPs 1593
English MPs 1597–1598
17th-century English judges